Stoneage Romeos is the debut album by Australian rock group Hoodoo Gurus. Released in March 1984 by Big Time Records in Australia, the album's release saw them receive record sales to complement their already strong reputation for live performances. With radio and television support for their third single "My Girl" (1983), complete with a film clip about a greyhound of the same name, the band's following grew. The album's other singles were "Leilani", "Tojo" and "I Want You Back". The album peaked at number 29 on the Australian charts.

The band won "Best Debut Album" at the 1984 Countdown Awards.

A&M Records released the album in the United States on 7 September 1984. 

Stoneage Romeos was re-released by Arcadia Records on 1 October 2002, with two additional tracks, "Hoodoo You Love" and "Be My Guru". EMI also re-released the album on 24 October 2005 with three bonus tracks, "Leilani Pt. 2", "Be My Guru" and "Hoodoo You Love", a fold-out poster and liner notes by Lindsay "The Doctor" McDougall of Frenzal Rhomb. 

In October 2010, the album was listed in the top 30 in the book, 100 Best Australian Albums.

Release
The title Stoneage Romeos is taken from a Three Stooges short film. The Australian LP, designed by Yanni Stumbles, sported a cartoonish nod to the 1966 caveman flick One Million Years B.C., all menacing dinosaurs and Day-Glo colors, whilst in America, consumers got a stylized sleeve featuring arty renditions of the giant reptiles. On the change of covers, the band's frontman Dave Faulkner would later recall:

Track listing

Australian release

US release

Personnel
Credited to:

 James Baker — drums
 Clyde Bramley – bass, vocals
 Dave Faulkner — guitar, lead vocals, keyboards
 Brad Shepherd — lead guitar, vocals, harmonica, percussion
 Michael Farmer – additional percussion
 Producer, Engineer – Alan Thorne
 Mastering – Bob, Carbone, Frank DeLuna
 Artwork (cover concept and design) — Yanni Stumbles
 Photography (pics) — Tom Takacs
 Other (the boss) — Stuart Thorne

Charts

Certifications

See also
 Stoneage Cameos

References

Hoodoo Gurus albums
1984 debut albums